A kickbike (bikeboard, footbike, pedicycle) is a type of kick scooter (also referred to as a push-scooter or scooter) and is a human-powered street vehicle with a handlebar, deck, and wheels propelled by a rider pushing off the ground. The kickbike often has a large standard size bicycle front wheel and a much smaller rear wheel, which allows for a much faster ride.

History

The modern kickbike was developed in the early 1990s by Hannu Vierikko who was active at the time in kicksled racing. (A kicksled is a type of human powered sled that is in common use in Scandinavia.) In 1994 Vierikko founded Kickbike Worldwide in Finland to produce and market kickbikes.

Use

Amish communities also use kickbikes in preference to bicycles for several reasons, including the safety and unaffordability of early bicycles, and the risk of gearing mechanisms as a source of vanity. Kickbikes can be used for dryland mushing, also called "dog scootering."

Sport
Some former world champions include Jan Vlasek and Alpo Kuusisto.

Gallery

Sport

See also
Balance bicycle

References

Human-powered vehicles
Sports equipment
Wheeled vehicles
Kick scooters
Vehicles introduced in 1994